Vanuatu competed at the 2000 Summer Olympics in Sydney, Australia. Francois Latil was the oldest competitor, of any nationality, to participate in the Sydney Games, at the age of 62.

Latil qualified on merit, while Kipsen and Mahuk, in track and field, received wildcards to compete at the Games.

Archery

Athletics

Men

Track events

Women

Track events

See also
 Vanuatu at the 2000 Summer Paralympics

References

Wallechinsky, David (2004). The Complete Book of the Summer Olympics (Athens 2004 Edition). Toronto, Canada. . 
International Olympic Committee (2001). The Results. Retrieved 12 November 2005.
Sydney Organising Committee for the Olympic Games (2001). Official Report of the XXVII Olympiad Volume 1: Preparing for the Games. Retrieved 20 November 2005.
Sydney Organising Committee for the Olympic Games (2001). Official Report of the XXVII Olympiad Volume 2: Celebrating the Games. Retrieved 20 November 2005.
Sydney Organising Committee for the Olympic Games (2001). The Results. Retrieved 20 November 2005.
International Olympic Committee Web Site

Nations at the 2000 Summer Olympics
2000
2000 in Vanuatuan sport